The 1982 Tour de Suisse was the 46th edition of the Tour de Suisse cycle race and was held from 16 June to 25 June 1982. The race started in Volketswil and finished in Zürich. The race was won by Giuseppe Saronni of the Del Tongo team.

General classification

References

1982
Tour de Suisse
Tour de Suisse
1982 Super Prestige Pernod